London Roar is a professional swimming club based in London and one of the first clubs of the International Swimming League (ISL) to be formed. It was formed in March 2019, with an international roster of swimmers including Adam Peaty who was among the first to support the formation of ISL independent of FINA. It is run by its general manager Rob Woodhouse. London hosted the sixth of the seven meets in ISL's inaugural season in 2019. The team finished second in 2019 and third in 2020.

Team roster
Six swimmers were named as co-captains in seasons one: Sydney Pickrem, Kyle Chalmers, Adam Peaty, Mireia Belmonte, Cate Campbell and James Guy. Peaty and Pickrem were initially announced as captains in the second season, followed by Alia Atkinson and Guilherme Guido. The team roster changes from year to year, ranging in number 32 to 36 swimmers, although only 28, 12 men and 12 women plus 2 men and 2 women for the relay, competed in ISL events. , the team roster is:

Competition history
London Roar reached the final of the first season of the International Swimming League in 2019 in Las Vegas, and finished second behind Energy Standard.

The 2020 International Swimming League was held in Budapest at the Duna Arena, which was used throughout the tournament. London Roar finished third in the final.

Team member Adam Peaty broke the short-course 100m breaststroke world record twice. Kira Toussaint broke the short-course 50m backstroke world record in the semi-finals.

References

External links
London Roar at ISL

British swim teams
International Swimming League
Swimming clubs in the United Kingdom
Sports teams in London